Phan Bá Vành (潘伯鑅, died March 12, 1827), a native of Minh Giám village (now Vũ Tiên, Thái Bình Province in coastal northern Vietnam), was the charismatic leader of one of Vietnam's largest peasant uprisings, the Phan Bá Vành's Rebellion, against the Emperor Minh Mạng, the second emperor of Nguyen Vietnam.  At the height of the insurgency, the command of Bá Vành's army had as many as 24 commanders with bases in many localities.  He is believed to have died on the battlefield on March 12, 1827, thus ending six years of rebellion.

References

1827 deaths
Nguyen dynasty
Year of birth unknown